Allogriphoneura is a genus of small flies of the family Lauxaniidae.

Species
A. annuliventris Hendel, 1926
A. phacosoma Hendel, 1926

References

Lauxaniidae
Schizophora genera
Taxa named by Friedrich Georg Hendel
Diptera of South America